MVY is the IATA airport code for Martha's Vineyard Airport.

MVY may also refer to:

Martha's Vineyard, generally
VIM-Aviaservice (ICAO airline code: MVY)
Maiya language (ISO 639 language code: mvy)